Filipe Nery Rodrigues (born 19 October 1962) is an Indian politician, businessperson and civil engineer from Goa. He was elected to the Goa Legislative Assembly, representing the Velim Assembly constituency in the 1999, 2002, 2007, and  2017 elections as a member of the Indian National Congress. In July 2019 he was one of ten Indian National Congress members who joined the Bharatiya Janata Party.

Early life and education 
Rodrigues was born to Cruz Rodrigues. He completed his diploma in civil engineering at Government Polytechnic, Panaji in 1984.

References

Living people
Former members of Indian National Congress from Goa
People from South Goa district
Goa MLAs 2017–2022
Bharatiya Janata Party politicians from Goa
Nationalist Congress Party politicians from Goa
1962 births